Catocala deducta is a moth in the family Erebidae first described by Eduard Friedrich Eversmann in 1843. It is found in Russia (Urals, Altai).

The larvae possibly feed on Salix and Populus species.

References

deducta
Moths described in 1843
Moths of Asia